Chamaesaura tenuior, the Cape snake lizard, is a species of lizard which is found in the eastern Democratic Republic of the Congo, Uganda, Kenya, and Tanzania.

References

tenuior
Reptiles of the Democratic Republic of the Congo
Reptiles of Kenya
Reptiles of Tanzania
Reptiles of Uganda
Reptiles described in 1895
Taxa named by Albert Günther